Marco Ibraim de Sousa Airosa (born 6 August 1984) is an Angolan footballer who most recently played as a right back for Loures.

Club career
Airosa was born in Luanda. During his Portuguese career he represented G.D.P. Costa de Caparica, F.C. Alverca, F.C. Barreirense, S.C. Olhanense – loaned by U.D. Leiria, for whom he never appeared – C.D. Fátima, C.D. Nacional (where he made his Primeira Liga debut) and C.D. Aves.

Having signed with the club in 2011 at the age of 27, Airosa went on to spend several seasons in the Cypriot First Division with AEL Limassol.

International career
A member of the Angola national team, Airosa was called up to the 2006 FIFA World Cup and the 2008 Africa Cup of Nations. He appeared in four matches in the latter tournament, helping the country to the quarter-finals in Ghana.

References

External links

1984 births
Living people
Footballers from Luanda
Angolan footballers
Association football defenders
Girabola players
C.R.D. Libolo players
Primeira Liga players
Liga Portugal 2 players
F.C. Alverca players
F.C. Barreirense players
U.D. Leiria players
S.C. Olhanense players
C.D. Fátima players
C.D. Nacional players
C.D. Aves players
Cypriot First Division players
AEL Limassol players
Angola international footballers
2006 FIFA World Cup players
2008 Africa Cup of Nations players
2012 Africa Cup of Nations players
2013 Africa Cup of Nations players
Angolan expatriate footballers
Expatriate footballers in Portugal
Expatriate footballers in Cyprus
Angolan expatriate sportspeople in Portugal